The Buffalo River is the largest tributary of the Tugela River in South Africa. It follows a southerly route into KwaZulu-Natal past Newcastle then turns southeast past Rorke's Drift, before joining the Tugela River at Ngubevu near Nkandla. During the nineteenth century it formed part of the boundary between the Colony of Natal and Zululand.

The Buffalo River has a number of tributaries, including the Ingagane from the SW and the Blood River from the NE, which it joins near Kandi Mountain.  Rorke's Drift is a ford across the Buffalo River which is one of the famous places of the 1878-79 Anglo-Zulu War and Isandhlwana is another important place of that war located about 20 km SE of the river, not far from the confluence with the Tugela.

Tributaries 
 Batshe
 Bzangoma
 Blood River
 Cold Stream
 Doringspruit
 Dorpspruit
 Kweekspruit
 Mangeni River
 Imbabane River
 Mngeni River
 Mbizana River (Buffalo)
 Ndweni
 Ingagane
 Sandspruit
 Sibindi
 Slang River
 Teku River
 Wasbankspruit
 Womeni

See also 
 List of rivers of South Africa
 Drainage basins of South Africa

References

External links
White Water Rafting in South Africa

Tugela River
Rivers of KwaZulu-Natal